New Zealand has been participating at the Deaflympics since 1957. New Zealand has earned about 18 medals at the Deaflympic Games. 

New Zealand has also competed at the Winter Deaflympics on two occasions, in 1987 and in 1991.

Medal tallies

Summer Deaflympics

See also 
 New Zealand at the Olympics
 New Zealand at the Paralympics

References 

Nations at the Deaflympics
Parasports in New Zealand
Deaf culture in New Zealand